State Route 271 (SR 271) is a  route that serves as a connection between U.S. Route 82/U.S. Route 231 (US 82/US 231) and Interstate 85 (I-85) in Montgomery, Alabama.

Route description
SR 271 begins at the intersection of Troy Highway, which carries US 82 (SR 6) and US 231 (SR 53), and Taylor Road. The route heads north on Taylor Road, which is a divided, six-lane street. It passes through grassland dotted with residential neighborhoods until it intersects Vaughn Road. Between Vaughn Road and Interstate 85 (I-85), SR 271 serves as a major access road for the nearby housing developments and shopping centers. It intersects I-85 with a simple diamond interchange with an additional cloverleaf loop from northbound SR 271 to southbound I-85. North of I-85, Taylor Road becomes an undivided four-lane street.

Major intersections

References

271
Highways in Montgomery, Alabama
Transportation in Montgomery County, Alabama